Roger Daniel Velasques (born 11 December 1943) was a French athlete who competed mainly in the 400 metres.

He competed for France in the 1972 Summer Olympics held in Munich, Germany in the 4 x 400 metre relay where he won the bronze medal with his teammates Gilles Bertould, Francis Kerbiriou and Jacques Carette.

References

Sports Reference

1943 births
Living people
French male sprinters
Olympic bronze medalists for France
Athletes (track and field) at the 1972 Summer Olympics
Athletes (track and field) at the 1976 Summer Olympics
Olympic athletes of France
French people of Portuguese descent
Medalists at the 1972 Summer Olympics
Olympic bronze medalists in athletics (track and field)
20th-century French people
21st-century French people